Mike Alexander Cevallos Yaguachi (born 22 June 2001) is an Ecuadorian professional footballer who plays as a forward for Spanish club FE Grama.

Club career
Born in Guayaquil, Cevallos moved to Valencia, Spain at the age of six. He represented CD Dénia and Benidorm CF before joining Málaga CF's youth setup in 2016.

After progressing through the youth categories, Cevallos made his senior debut with the reserves on 29 September 2019, coming on as a late substitute and scoring the equalizer in a 2–2 Tercera División home draw against Antequera CF. He was unable to become a regular starter at the B-side, leaving the club in July 2021 and subsequently moved to UD Ibiza's reserves CF Sant Rafel late in the month.

Cevallos was Sant Rafel's top scorer with 14 goals, but was unable to prevent the side's relegation from Tercera División RFEF. He made his professional debut with Ibiza on 15 May 2022, replacing Miguel Ángel Guerrero in a 0–4 Segunda División away loss against CD Mirandés.

International career
Cevallos was called up by Ecuador at under-20 level in September 2020.

References

External links

2001 births
Living people
Ecuadorian footballers
Sportspeople from Guayaquil
Association football forwards
Segunda División players
Tercera División players
Tercera Federación players
Atlético Malagueño players
CF Sant Rafel players
UD Ibiza players